The 1995 ITU Triathlon World Championships was a triathlon event held in Cancún, Mexico on 12 November 1995, organised by the International Triathlon Union. The course was a  swim,  bike,  run.

Results

Men's Championship
The top three finishers in the men's championship race was a repeat of the top 3 from the 1994 ITU Triathlon World Championships.

Women's Championship
Karen Smyers won her second ITU Triathlon World Championships, following up her 1990 Championship win. The win also came one month after capturing the 1995 Ironman World Championship title.

Junior men

Junior women

References

World Triathlon Series
World Championships
1995 in Mexican sports
Sport in Cancún
International sports competitions hosted by Mexico
Triathlon competitions in Mexico